Pedro Díaz (1546 – 12 January 1618) was a Roman Catholic missionary.

Biography
Díaz was born in Lupedo, Diocese of Toledo, Spain.  At twenty he joined the Society of Jesus, and had already been a teacher of philosophy for two years. In 1572 he was sent by Saint Francis Borgia to Mexico with the first band of Jesuits assigned to that mission, and was the first master of novices in the Province of Mexico. As rector of the colleges of Guadalajara and Mexico, superior of the professed house, provincial, and founder of the colleges of Oaxaca and Guadalajara in Mexico and founder of Mérida in Mexico, and twice procurator to Rome, he occupies a prominent place in the early history of the Jesuits in Mexico.  He died in Mexico.

He was also the first to start the mission work of his brethren among the Indians of New Spain. He wrote the Letteras de Missionibus per Indiam Occidentalem a Nostris de Societate Institutis per annos 1590 et 1591.

External links
Catholic Encyclopedia article

1546 births
1618 deaths
16th-century Spanish Jesuits
17th-century Spanish Jesuits
Spanish Roman Catholic missionaries